Jean Dubois may refer to:

 Jean Dubois (canoeist) (1914–?), Belgian sprint canoeist
 Jean Dubois (field hockey) (1926–2021), Belgian field hockey player
 Jean Dubois the Elder (1604–1679), French landscape painter
 John Dubois (1764–1842), also Jean, French Catholic missionary in Virginia and Appalachians, third bishop of New York
 Jean-Antoine Dubois (1765–1848), French Catholic missionary in India
 Jean Dubois (linguist) (1920–2015), French linguist